Raadi is a borough in Tartu Parish, Tartu County.

The borough is established in 2022 when parts of Vahi small borough and Tila village was merged into the new settlement unit: Raadi borough.

The borough has a population of 3000 (as of 2022).

References

Boroughs and small boroughs in Estonia
Populated places in Tartu County